is a mountain located in Fukui Prefecture, Japan. This mountain is one of the 100 Famous Japanese Mountains.

Outline
It is not a volcano although it emerged from originally volcanic terrain. It is, over a long period, the product of erosion of a caldera formed in the Middle Miocene, when the Sea of Japan was developed.

Vegetation

The foot of Mount Arashima is covered in dense beech forest which, turning yellow in autumn, making the mountain stand out from the rest of the surrounding landscape.

The ascent of the north face, by the main hiking trail, leads to a plateau (at the elevation of about 1,200 m): Shakunage-daira (Rhododendron plateau), a place famous for the flowering of various species of azaleas in spring.

References

External links

Arashima